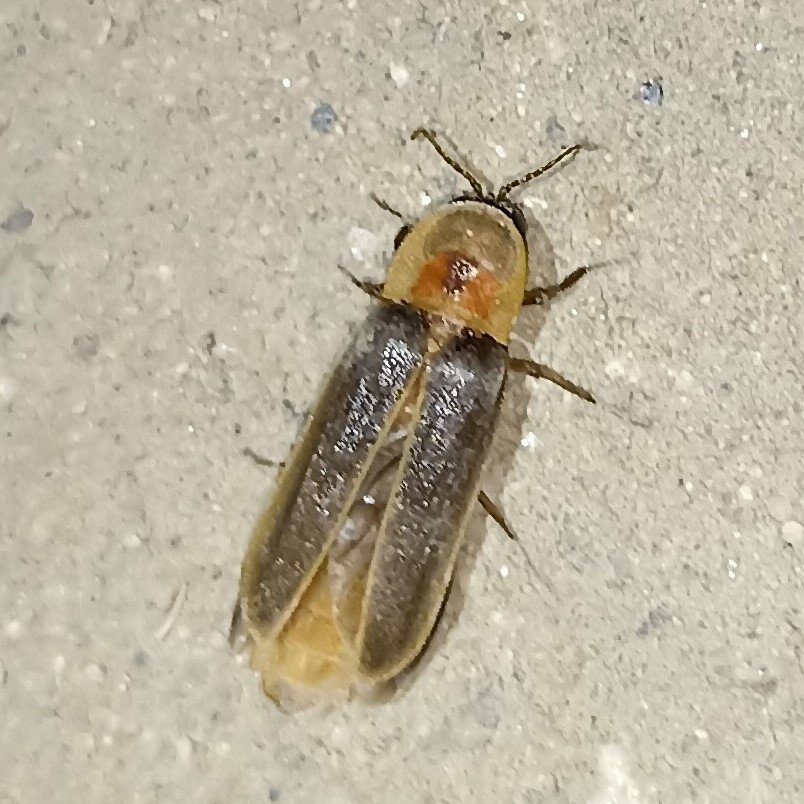

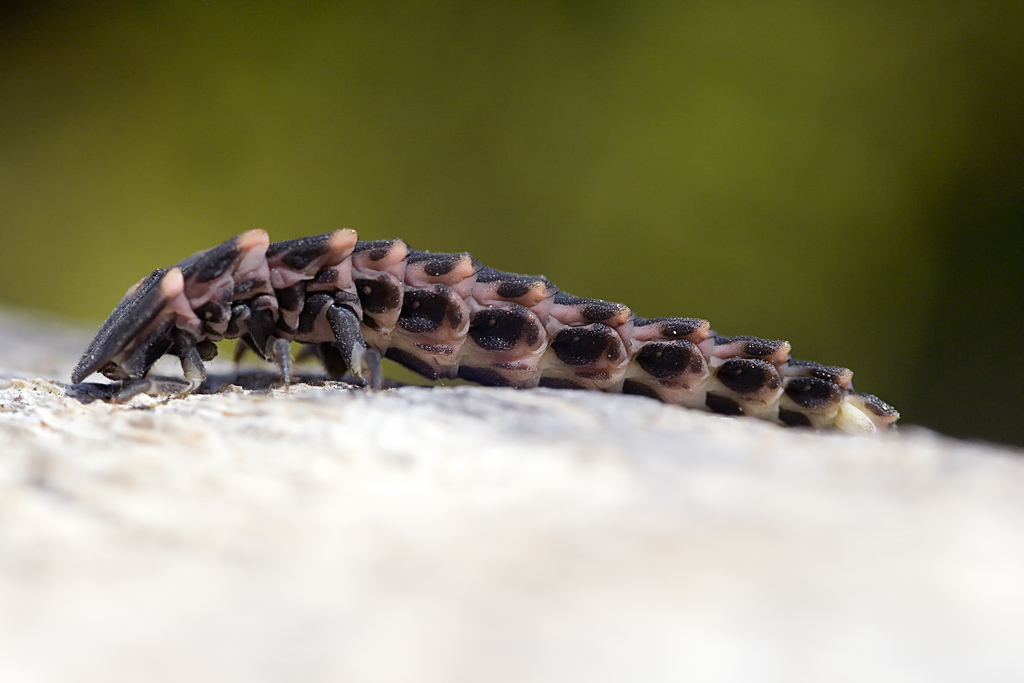
- Adult (top) and larva (bottom)

Scientific classification
- Domain: Eukaryota
- Kingdom: Animalia
- Phylum: Arthropoda
- Class: Insecta
- Order: Coleoptera
- Suborder: Polyphaga
- Infraorder: Elateriformia
- Family: Lampyridae
- Genus: Nyctophila
- Species: N. reichii

Binomial name
- Nyctophila reichii Du Val, 1859

= Nyctophila reichii =

Species of firefly

Nyctophila reichii, commonly known as the Mediterranean firefly, is a species of firefly. The species is very common in the southern and eastern part of the Iberian Peninsula.
